Ciccarelli is an Italian surname. Notable people with the surname include:

Alejandro Ciccarelli (1811-1879), Italian-born Chilean painter
Aliguccio Ciccarelli, Italian painter
Antonio Kim Ciccarelli (born 1974), Italian economist and businessman
Dino Ciccarelli (born 1960), Canadian hockey player
Mattia Ciccarelli (1481–1543), Italian Roman Catholic professed religious
Margot Ciccarelli (born 1993), Brazilian jiu-jitsu competitor 
Michael Ciccarelli (born 1996), Canadian snowboarder
Ray Ciccarelli (born 1970), American stock car racing driver

See also
Cicarelli

Italian-language surnames